Kotovice is a municipality and village in Plzeň-South District in the Plzeň Region of the Czech Republic. It has about 300 inhabitants.

Administrative parts
Villages of Nový and Záluží are administrative parts of Kotovice.

References

Villages in Plzeň-South District